The Loire coal mining basin is an area of France that has been shaped by seven centuries of coal extraction from the 13th century to the 20th century and represents a significant period in the history of European industrialisation.

See also
Saint-Étienne Mine Museum

Coal mining regions in France